Philippa Anne Gardner  (born 29 July 1965) is a British computer scientist and academic. She has been Professor of Theoretical Computer Science at the Department of Computing, Imperial College London since 2009. She was director of the Research Institute in Automated Program Analysis and Verification between 2013 and 2016. In 2020 Gardner was elected Fellow of the Royal Academy of Engineering.

Early life and education
Gardner was born on 29 July 1965 in Exeter, Devon, England. In 1988, she got her M.Sc. degree in logic and computation from Bristol University, supervised by John Shepherdson. Her doctoral studies were supervised by Gordon Plotkin at the University of Edinburgh; she was awarded her Doctor of Philosophy (PhD) degree in 1992. Her doctoral thesis was titled "Representing Logics in Type Theory".

Career
After being awarded an EPSRC Advanced Fellowship at Cambridge University with Robin Milner, Gardner held a BP Research Fellowship with The Royal Society of Edinburgh between 1994-1996. She took a lectureship with Imperial College London in 2001. She was appointed Professor of Theoretical Computer Science in 2009.

Her current research looks at program verification. Gardner's role with the Research Institute in Automated Program Analysis and Verification is funded by GCHQ and the Engineering and Physical Sciences Research Council (EPSRC).

Gardner was on the Newton International Fellowships Committee: Physical Sciences, for The Royal Society, from 2010 to 2012.

Gardner was awarded the President & Rector's Award for Excellence in Teaching at Imperial College London in 2013.

References

1965 births
Living people
Alumni of the University of Edinburgh
British computer scientists
British women computer scientists
Theoretical computer scientists
Scientists from Exeter
Academics of the Department of Computing, Imperial College London
Fellows of the Royal Academy of Engineering
Female Fellows of the Royal Academy of Engineering